In mathematical physics, the conformal symmetry of spacetime is expressed by an extension of the Poincaré group, known as the conformal group. The extension includes special conformal transformations and dilations. In three spatial plus one time dimensions, conformal symmetry has 15 degrees of freedom: ten for the Poincaré group, four for special conformal transformations, and one for a dilation.

Harry Bateman and Ebenezer Cunningham were the first to study the conformal symmetry of Maxwell's equations. They called a generic expression of conformal symmetry a spherical wave transformation. General relativity in two spacetime dimensions also enjoys conformal symmetry.

Generators

The Lie algebra of the conformal group has the following representation:

 

where  are the Lorentz generators,  generates translations,  generates scaling transformations (also known as dilatations or dilations) and  generates the special conformal transformations.

Commutation relations

The commutation relations are as follows:

 
other commutators vanish. Here  is the Minkowski metric tensor.

The special  conformal transformations are given by

where  is a parameter describing the transformation.
 
which shows that it consists of an inversion, followed by a translation, followed by a second  inversion.

In two dimensional spacetime, the transformations of the conformal group are the conformal transformations. There are infinitely many of them.

In more than two dimensions, Euclidean conformal transformations map circles to circles, and hyperspheres to hyperspheres with a straight line considered a degenerate circle and a hyperplane a degenerate hypercircle.

In more than two Lorentzian dimensions, conformal transformations map null rays to null rays and light cones to light cones with a null hyperplane being a degenerate light cone.

Applications

Conformal field theory

In relativistic quantum field theories, the possibility of symmetries is strictly restricted by Coleman–Mandula theorem under physically reasonable assumptions. 
The largest possible global symmetry group of a non-supersymmetric interacting field theory is a direct product of the conformal group with an internal group. Such theories are known as conformal field theories.

Second-order phase transitions

One particular application is to critical phenomena in systems with local interactions. Fluctuations in such systems are conformally invariant at the critical point. That allows for classification of universality classes of phase transitions in terms of conformal field theories

Conformal invariance is also present in two-dimensional turbulence at high Reynolds number.

High-energy physics

Many theories studied in high-energy physics admit conformal symmetry due to it typically being implied by local scale invariance (see here for motivation and counterexamples). A famous example is d=4, N=4 supersymmetric Yang–Mills theory due its relevance for AdS/CFT correspondence. Also, the worldsheet in string theory is described by a two-dimensional conformal field theory coupled to two-dimensional gravity.

Mathematical proofs of conformal invariance in lattice models 

Physicists have found that many lattice models become conformally invariant in the critical limit. However, mathematical proofs of these results have only appeared much later, and only in some cases.

In 2010, the mathematician Stanislav Smirnov was awarded the Fields medal "for the proof of conformal invariance of percolation and the planar Ising model in statistical physics".

In 2020, the mathematician Hugo Duminil-Copin and his collaborators proved that rotational invariance exists at the boundary between phases in many physical systems.

See also
 Conformal map
 Conformal group
 Coleman–Mandula theorem
 Renormalization group
 Scale invariance
 Superconformal algebra
 Conformal Killing equation

References

Sources 
 

Symmetry
Scaling symmetries
Conformal field theory